Stanley Christodoulou (Greek: Στάνλυ Χριστοδούλου; born 31 January 1946) is a South African international boxing judge and referee of Greek Cypriot descent. Christodoulou has judged bouts in his native South Africa, as well as internationally with the WBA, with whom he is involved in leaderships roles dealing with officiating.

Career
Christodoulou began his boxing career in 1963 and refereed his first world title bout in 1973 when Romeo Anaya and Arnold Taylor fought for the world bantamweight title.

Christodoulou was inducted into the International Boxing Hall of Fame in Canastota, New York on 13 June 2004. He was the first man to referee world title fights in all 17 weight categories, and the third to oversee 100 world title bouts. Christodoulou served as executive director of the South African Boxing Board of Control, and has twice been named South African boxing's 'Man of the Year'.

He is a member of the World Boxing Association's International Officials Committee, and in 1980 was named the WBA's 'Referee of the Year'.

Notable bouts
Some of the notable bouts Christodoulou has refereed include:
 Thomas Hearns v Pipino Cuevas
 Aaron Pryor v Alexis Argüello (First bout)
 Marvin Hagler v Roberto Durán
 Victor Galindez v Richie Kates

References

External links
Christodoulou in the Boxing Encyclopaedia
Article on Christodoulou
Christodoulou in Boxing's Hall of Fame
Who's Who of Southern Africa

1944 births
International Boxing Hall of Fame inductees
Boxing judges
Boxing referees
South African people of Greek descent
White South African people
Sportspeople from Johannesburg
Living people